Makkah Masjid or Mecca Masjid, is a congregational mosque in Hyderabad, India. It is one of the largest mosques in India with a capacity of 10,000 people. The mosque was built during the 17th century, and is a state-protected monument. It serves as the primary mosque for the Old City of Hyderabad, and is located close to the historic landmarks of Charminar, Chowmahalla Palace and Laad Bazaar. 

Muhammad Qutb Shah, the sixth ruler of the Qutb Shahi dynasty, commissioned bricks to be made from the soil brought from Mecca, the holiest site of Islam, and used them in the construction of the central arch of the mosque, thus giving the mosque its name.  

The complex was put by UNESCO on its "tentative list" to become a World Heritage Site in 2014, with others in the region, under the name Monuments and Forts of the Deccan Sultanate (despite there being a number of different sultanates).

History
The construction of the Makkah Masjid began in the year 1617 CE, during the reign of Sultan Muhammad Qutb Shah, the sixth Qutb Shahi Sultan of Golconda (now Hyderabad). The ruler personally laid its foundation stone. Around 8,000 workers were employed to build the mosque. It was completed by Mughal Emperor Aurangzeb in 1693. The three arched facades have been carved from a single piece of granite, which took five years to quarry. 

Jean-Baptiste Tavernier, a French explorer, in his travelogue observed:It is about 50 years since they began to build a splendid pagoda in the town which will be the grandest in all India when it is completed. The size of the stone is the subject of special accomplishment, and that of a niche, which is its place for prayer, is an entire rock of such enormous size that they spent five years in quarrying it, and 500 to 600 men were employed continually on its work. It required still more time to roll it up on to conveyance by which they brought it to the pagoda; and they took 1400 oxen to draw it.

Bombing

On 18 May 2007, a bomb exploded inside the Makkah Masjid during Friday prayers, killing at least thirteen people and injuring dozens more.

Architecture
The Mecca Masjid is considered to be one of the best architectural works of the Qutb Shahis. It is constructed entirely of dressed stone, rather than rubble or plaster. The facade of the prayer hall features five open arches, and is flanked by two minarets. Each minaret is topped by a dome, and adjoined to an arcaded balcony lining either side of the prayer hall.

The sahn (courtyard) of the mosque measures 108 square metres. It contains a sundial, as well as the remains of a hammam. Two minarets lie on either side of the main entrance to the mosque complex. 

Towards the southern end of the mosque lie the marble tombs of the Asaf Jahi rulers and family members, save the first (Asaf Jah I) and the last (Asaf Jah VII). These are housed in a rectangular, arched, and canopied building, which was added in 1914 during the rule of Mir Osman Ali Khan, the last Asaf Jahi ruler. At both ends of this resting place for the Asaf Jahi's are two rectangular blocks with four minarets each. These minarets have elegant and circular balconies with low ornamental walls and arches. Above them is an octagonal inverted platter from which the rest of the minarets soar until arrested by a dome and a spire.

References

External links

Mosques in Hyderabad, India
Qutb Shahi architecture
Hyderabad State
Religious buildings and structures completed in 1694
1694 establishments in Asia